Adios Amigos is a 2016 Dutch drama film directed by Albert Jan van Rees. It is a remake of the 2011 Belgian film Come as You Are. It was listed as one of eleven films that could be selected as the Dutch submission for the Best Foreign Language Film at the 89th Academy Awards, but it was not nominated.

Cast
 Martijn Lakemeier as Lars
 Yannick van de Velde as Philip
 Geert Lageveen as Henk
 Juul Vrijdag as Mieke
 Margot Ros as Lub
 Bas Hoeflaak as Joost

References

External links
 

2016 films
2016 drama films
Dutch drama films
2010s Dutch-language films